Berthe Bady (1872–1921) was a French actress of Belgian origin. She was the companion of Lugné-Poe and Henry Bataille. The fortunes she had won as an actress were devoted to her household with Bataille. Berthe died in isolation at Jouy-sur-Eure.

Life

Berthe Bady was born in Lodelinsart, Belgium. She was educated at the Convent of the Sacred Heart of Dour, and then enrolled at the Brussels Conservatory in 1891, before joining the Vaudeville Theater in 1894. 
She accompanied Lugné-Poe in founding the Théâtre de l'Œuvre (Theatre of the Work).

She was Henry Bataille's muse.
 
She played at the Théâtre de l'Odéon Theatre from 1901 to 1904.
 Fernand Crommelynck dedicated his play, Les Amants puérils (Youthful Lovers) to her.

Bady died at Jouy-sur-Eure in northern France. Louis Aragon evokes her death in Blanche ou l'oubli.

Notable performances

Theatre
1893 : Rosmersholm by Henrik Ibsen, directed by Lugné-Poe; performing Théâtre de l'Œuvre at the Théâtre des Bouffes du Nord
1894 : La Belle au bois dormant (The Sleeping Beauty) by Robert d'Humières and Henry Bataille, directed by Lugné-Poe
1894 : Annabella (adaptation by Maurice Maeterlinck of John Ford's 'Tis Pity She's a Whore), directed by Lugné-Poe
1894 : Une Nuit d'avril à Céos by Gabriel Trarieux, directed by Lugné Poe; performing Théâtre de l'Œuvre at Théâtre des Bouffes du Nord
1894 : Au-dessus des forces humaines (adaptation by Maurice Prozor of Bjørnstjerne Bjørnson's Over ævne), directed by Lugné-Poe
1894 : L'Image by Maurice Beaubourg. Directed by Lugné Poe; performing Théâtre de l'Œuvre at Theatre des Bouffes du Nord
1894 : La Vie muette by Maurice Beaubourg; staging Lugné Poe; performing Théâtre de l'Œuvre
1895 : Le Cuivre (Copper) by Paul Adam, directed by André Antoine
1902 : Résurrection (adapted from Leo Tolstoy's Resurrection) by Henry Bataille at the Odéon-Théâtre de l'Europe
1903 : L'Idiot by André de Lorde at the Odéon-Théâtre de l'Europe
1904 : Maman Colibri by Henry Bataille at the Vaudeville Theatre
1907 : Florise of Théodore de Banville to the Odéon-Théâtre de l'Europe
1910 : La Vierge folle (The Foolish Virgin) by Henry Bataille, Théâtre du Gymnase
1911 : La Femme nue by Henry Bataille at Théâtre de la Porte Saint-Martin
1913 : Le Chèvrefeuille by Gabriele D'Annunzio
1913 : L'Enchantement by Henry Bataille at Théâtre du Gymnase

Film
1918 : Ecce Homo (Behold [the] man) by Abel Gance, with the danseuse-mime Dourga

References

1872 births
1921 deaths
French actresses
19th-century French actresses
French stage actresses
20th-century French actresses
Belgian emigrants to France